Mareero, Marero located ( eastern direction of Bosaso. It possesses  coastal habitat, frankincense and other myrrh groups growing plateau, grazing areas, sizeable beach and most importantly the mareero natural harbour which has deep enough to provide anchorage. The mareero harbour became an illegal immigration route connecting Somalia and Yemen and Arab peninsula at large since the collapse of the Somali central government early 1991. The harbour was formerly used by Somali business communities for export and import of goods for centuries. 
According to reports boats carrying arms smuggled from Yemen have been docked at the Marero harbour.

Mareero beach is so popular for its sizeable beach where visitors and tourists have been flocking the past recent years.

References

External links
 Marero, Somalia

Ports and harbours of Somalia